The Human Development Innovation Fund (also known as HDIF or HDIFtz or the Human Development Impact Fund) is a UKAid financed 40 million British Pound challenge fund providing grants to businesses, NGOs and research institutions for scaling innovations focused on the quality, value for money, and sustainability of basic services in education, health and water, sanitation and hygiene (WASH). HDIF was launched on May 12, 2014 with the support of the Vice President of Tanzania.

Among other honors received, in 2019 HDIF won the British Expertise award for best "International Collaborative Project."

According to DFID's business case for establishing the fund, the intended outputs of HDIF are testing and use of new innovations to manage and deliver basic human development services and enhance the evidence base and innovation ecosystem in Tanzania. HDIF supports the innovation ecosystem and government's roles in science, technology, and innovation through collaborations with Tanzania Commission for Science and Technology (COSTECH). 

Distinguishing factors of HDIF as a challenge fund include the long investment period compared to other challenge funds, which reflects the desired intent to scale early innovations.

HDIF closed on 31 July 2021 after more than seven years as a successful program. It is succeeded by the Funguo programme which was launched on 17 May 2021 at the opening ceremony of Innovation Week 2021.

Innovation Week
In March 2015, HDIF curated the first annual Innovation Week in Tanzania, with open collaborative events on innovation and research, development, entrepreneurship, technology, and the arts. Collaborators in Innovation Week 2015 included KINU Innovation and Co-Creation Space, COSTECH, Ifakara Health Institute, Buni Innovation Hub, Nafasi Art Space, Deloitte Consulting, Institute of Management and Entrepreneurship Development (IMED), Tanzania Renewable Energy Business Incubator (TAREBI), and Tanzania Entrepreneurship and Competitiveness Centre (TECC).

From March 13, 2016 to March 19, 2016, HDIF convened the 2nd Annual Innovation Week in collaboration with DFID, COSTECH, BUNI Innovation Hub, KINU Innovation Hub, Deloitte, Nafasi Art  Space, TAREBI, TASEF, NALEDI, NjeVenture, Ifakara Health Institute, Sauna Safari, Embassy of Finland, Archipelago and Palladium International.

A 3rd Annual Innovation Week took place from May 15–20, 2017. Participants in the event were "involved in creative storytelling, workshops for development, co-create an episode on innovation with Ubungo kids, listening to promising university's students led startups, explore research driven innovations by the Ifakara Health Institute and get an insight into development partner's donor funded approaches including the Principles for Digital Development."

The 4th annual Innovation Week took place from May 21-26, 2018 with the theme 'Innovation into Action'. 

The 5th annual Innovation Week took place from March 25 - 29 2019 and was attended by over 2,000 people with the theme 'Scaling and Sustaining Innovation for Human Development'. Regional Innovation Week events were held in Arusha and Iringa.

Innovation Week 2020 was the 6th Innovation Week, the theme was 'Innovate for Impact' with the hashtags #Innovate4Impact and #IW2020. It took place from 8 - 13 March 2020 in Dar es Salaam and from 16 - 20 March Mbeya, Iringa, Stone Town (Zanzibar) Dodoma, and Arusha, some events were held online due to COVID-19. The full schedule of events can be found on https://www.timetickets.co.tz/iw2020dar .   

Innovation Week Tanzania 2021 took place from 15 - 22 May 2021. Innovation Week 2022 is planned to be led by UNDP Tanzania through the Funguo Program.

Recognition
HDIF has received recognition from The Guardian, The African Prosperity Report launch by Legatum, TanzICT, the Minister of Communication, Science and Technology of Tanzania, the Daily News, and the Center for Education Innovations. In April 2019 HDIF won the British Expertise International Award for Best International Collaborative Project. 

Innovations supported by HDIF have received global recognition, including the use of drones for delivery of emergency medical supplies, nanofilters using a unique local business approach, and rats used to detect TB.

Portfolio
HDIF's portfolio consists of Initial Investments, Round 1, Round 2, and Round 3. Additionally, HDIF launched the Mawazo Challenge in 2016 to support earlier stage ideas from Tanzanian youth to be prototyped and launched. Round 3 of funding launched on June 19, 2017, with submissions due on September 8, 2017. A final round of Institutional Capacity Building grants were signed in early 2020. 

As of 2019, HDIF's investments include:

Partners
HDIF is funded by the United Kingdom's Department for International Development (DFID) through UKAid, managed by Palladium International (formerly known as GRM International) in consortium with KPMG, the Institute for Development Studies (IDS), Loughborough University, and Newcastle University.

References

External links
 

International development agencies
Innovation organizations
Department for International Development
Politics of Tanzania
Political organisations based in Tanzania